Georgina Haig (born 3 August 1985) is an Australian film and television actress, known for her roles in the Australian children's television series The Elephant Princess, as well as the American television series Fringe, Limitless and Once Upon a Time.

Early life and education
Haig was born in Melbourne, Victoria, Australia, to Gillian Haig, a fine artist, and Russell Hagg, an Australian script writer and film maker, whose credits include BMX Bandits, The Cup, Cash and Company and Blue Heelers. She grew up on the Mornington Peninsula. She has one younger brother, actor/model Julian Haig.

Throughout her early youth she studied ballet, obtaining Grade 8 with the Royal Academy of Dance. Haig attended Red Hill Consolidated School and then Toorak College for her high school education. She was a head prefect and completed her Gold Duke of Edinburgh's Award. She was accepted into the University of Melbourne to study Arts but deferred for one year to teach English in Vietnam at the Hanoi University of Science and Technology with Lattitude Global Volunteering. She then returned to Melbourne to pursue her studies and was accepted in the Western Australian Academy of Performing Arts to study acting. She graduated in 2008 at age 23.

Career
In her first year out of drama school Haig landed roles in two Australian feature films, Wasted on the Young and Road Train. She secured a recurring guest role in two seasons of the crime drama Underbelly. From 2009 to 2010 she also starred in the children's television series The Elephant Princess.

In 2010 she won a Best Actress Scream Festival award for her performance in thriller Crawl. She was considered for the role of Andromeda in the film Wrath of the Titans alongside several other actresses. The part ultimately went to Rosamund Pike. Haig was also considered for the role of Gwen Stacy in the 2012 film The Amazing Spider-Man, but lost the part to Emma Stone.

In 2012, she appeared in the internationally acclaimed Australian film The Sapphires, and made several guest appearances on the American FOX science-fiction series Fringe, as Henrietta "Etta" Bishop. She appeared in Dance Academy and had a guest role in an episode of comedy series A Moody Christmas.

Haig started 2013 with work on the sketch comedy show The Elegant Gentleman's Guide to Knife Fighting, playing a variety of characters. She then secured the lead role of Lee Anne Marcus in the CBS legal drama Reckless, where she played a police officer caught up in corruption at the Charleston, South Carolina Police Department. During that year she played the rock journalist Paula Yates in the miniseries INXS: Never Tear Us Apart, and defense lawyer Jasmine in the black comedy The Mule.

She worked with Australian comedian Lawrence Leung and husband Josh Mapleston on ABC Australia's farcical kung-fu comedy Maximum Choppage in 2014. Later that year she secured the much coveted role of Queen Elsa in the fourth season of Once Upon a Time.

In July 2015, Haig was cast in Syfy futuristic pilot Incorporated, but the role was later recast with Allison Miller. In November 2015, it was announced that Haig would have a recurring role alongside Bradley Cooper and Jake McDorman in the first season of CBS' crime drama Limitless. She starred as Annabel in Childhood's End, a Syfy three-part miniseries, based on a story by Arthur C. Clarke. In March 2016, she was cast as the female lead in The CW's Untitled Mars Project pilot.

In March 2020, it was announced Haig will replace Jessica Marais as Rachel Rafter in the upcoming series, Back to the Rafters, a sequel series to Packed to the Rafters.

Personal life
In June 2014, Haig married screenwriter and actor Josh Mapleston. In March 2017, their daughter Greta was born.

Filmography

Film

Television

References

External links

1985 births
Living people
21st-century Australian actresses
Actresses from Melbourne
Australian expatriate actresses in the United States
Australian film actresses
Australian television actresses